Urban Ministries, Inc. (UMI) is an independent, African American-owned and operated Christian media company founded in 1970.
UMI publishes Christian resources, including Sunday School and Vacation Bible School curricula, books, movies, and websites designed for African American churches and others seeking a diverse perspective on faith and life issues.

Since its founding, UMI has served over 40,000 churches across the United States, the Caribbean, and Africa. It is evangelical in its theology but rooted in the African American church tradition.

Founding and history 
The establishment of Urban Ministries, Inc. was the fulfillment of a boyhood dream that Melvin E. Banks had at the age of 12. Soon after becoming a Christian, Banks gave his testimony on one of the back roads of Birmingham, Alabama. An old, white-haired Black man heard his testimony and quoted this Scripture verse to him: "My people are destroyed for lack of knowledge" (Hosea 4:6). This verse made a great impression on Banks, and he determined to devote his life to educating African Americans with knowledge of the Bible and Christian teaching.

In 1955, Banks graduated from the Moody Bible Institute in Chicago. He went on to Wheaton College (Illinois), where he earned a Bachelor of Arts in Theology and a Master of Arts and Biblical Studies degree. He received an honorary Doctorate of Literature from Wheaton College in 1992.

While working at the predominantly white evangelical Christian publishing company Scripture Press, Banks realized the need for resources that would appeal to African Americans. In 1970, a Board of Directors was selected and Banks’s boyhood dream began to take shape with the incorporation of Urban Ministries. During its first 12 years, UMI operated out of the basement of the Banks family’s home. In the spring of 1996, UMI completed construction and took occupancy of a new headquarters facility located in Calumet City, Illinois, in South Suburban Chicago.

UMI today 
Today, UMI is one of the few independent African American-owned and operated religious publishers producing materials specifically for African American churches. UMI materials include Sunday School curriculum, Vacation Bible School resources, books, videos, and music, all of which depict or speak to people of color in the context of their culture.

Melvin Banks remains with the company as founder and chairman. Dr. Banks is the author and editor of a number of books and Bible studies. In Banks is also the founder of the Urban Outreach foundation, an elder in his local church, and a member of the boards of trustees of Wheaton College and the Circle Y Ranch. In 2017 the Evangelical Christian Publishers Association (ECPA) presented Dr. Banks with the Kenneth N. Taylor Lifetime Achievement Award for more than 50 years of excellence, innovation, integrity, and commitment to making the message of Christ more widely known.

References 

 Gilbreath, Edward. "Melvin Banks: An Agent of Healing and Hope," Wheaton magazine, Autumn 1999, pp. 14–15.
 Matlack, William H. "Heaven...Almost Heaven--Urban Ministries' Automatic Call Distributor System," Communications News, June 1999.

External links
 Urban Ministries, Inc. Official website

Christian mass media companies
Mass media companies of the United States